Pennsylvania's 19th congressional district was a congressional district that became obsolete for the 113th Congress in 2013, due to Pennsylvania's slower population growth compared to the rest of the nation.

In its last incarnation, the district included all of Adams and York Counties, and parts of Cumberland County. The last representative was Republican Todd Russell Platts, who decided to retire at the end of the 112th Congress.

Most of the 19th district remained intact and was renumbered as the 4th district.

List of members representing the district

References

 Congressional Biographical Directory of the United States 1774–present

External links
 Congressional redistricting in Pennsylvania

19
Former congressional districts of the United States
1833 establishments in Pennsylvania
2013 disestablishments in Pennsylvania
Constituencies established in 1833
Constituencies disestablished in 2013